Fermeuse ( NST) is a town in the Canadian province of Newfoundland and Labrador. The town had a population of 266 in the Canada 2021 Census.

The town is located on the eastern portion of the Avalon Peninsula approximately 80 kilometers south of St. John’s via paved two-lane highway.  Like other communities in the area, Fermeuse was used as a summer fishing station in the 1500s by the Portuguese and is referred to on early Portuguese maps as R. Fermoso and Rio Fremoze.  The fishery continues to be the economic engine for the town, but in recent history, projects such as a Marine Center and a wind power project have created new opportunities for residents.  
 
The harbour has excellent proximity to the offshore oil and gas operations off the coast of Newfoundland and Labrador.  Fermeuse Harbour is long (approximately 5 kilometers) and well protected.  It provides a naturally sheltered port with hilly terrain to the north and south.  The harbour possesses the key characteristics, including:
 Safe harbour in most all weather conditions
 Ice free
 Sufficient deep water, berthing spaces and supportive laydown areas.

Fermuese, also has with many scenic hiking trails with views of the Atlantic Ocean. The Bear Cove Point path is an 11.1-km point-to-point trail generally considered a moderately challenging route.   It takes an average of 3 h 49 min to complete and offers the opportunity for bird watching, hiking, and running.  The community also has many cottages catering to the numerous hikers of the East Coast Trail and other hiking trails in the area.

Fermeuse is the hometown of former NHL player Ryane Clowe who played with the New Jersey Devils, New York Rangers and San Jose Sharks.

Demographics 

References

See also
 List of cities and towns in Newfoundland and Labrador

Towns in Newfoundland and Labrador